Doyler Eustoquio Sánchez Guerrero  (born 12 October 1988 in Cúcuta, Colombia) is a Colombian weightlifter. He competed in the 69 kg event at the 2012 Summer Olympics and finished 14th. Sánchez won the bronze in the 69kg event of the 2011 Pan American Games.

References

Colombian male weightlifters
Weightlifters at the 2012 Summer Olympics
Olympic weightlifters of Colombia
1989 births
Living people
People from Cúcuta
Pan American Games medalists in weightlifting
Pan American Games bronze medalists for Colombia
Weightlifters at the 2011 Pan American Games
Medalists at the 2011 Pan American Games
20th-century Colombian people
21st-century Colombian people